The AEC railmotor was the first generally successful railmotor built for the Victorian Railways. 19 vehicles were constructed from 1922 to 1925, along with 24 trailer vehicles built to a similar design.

Design
Four different internal layouts were used, providing for different traffic.

Construction

In service
 AEC railmotors were used on the Reservoir – Whittlesea shuttle service from 1924 until 1931.
 On the Outer Circle line, a pair of AEC railmotors coupled back to back operated the Deepdene Dasher service from Riversdale to Deepdene from 15 August 1926 until 10 October 1927, after which the service was replaced by buses.

 A single AEC railmotor operated a shuttle service on the Upfield line, between Fawkner and Somerton (just south of the site of the current Roxburgh Park station), from 1928 until 1956. A turntable for the railmotor was installed at Fawkner and Somerton.

Withdrawal & preservation
The AECs were progressively withdrawn in the early 1950s as the new Walker railmotors came into service.

Model railways

HO Scale
Steam Era models

N Scale

See also
Victorian Railways
Associated Equipment Company

References

Victorian Railways railmotors
Railmotor, AEC